Carothers is a surname. Notable people with the surname include:

A. J. Carothers (1931–2007), American playwright and television writer, worked with Walt Disney
Craig Carothers, American singer-songwriter
Dennis Carothers Stanfill, American business executive, Rhodes Scholar and philanthropist
Don Carothers (1934–2008), American football player
Earling Carothers Garrison (Jim) (1921–1992), District Attorney of Orleans Parish, Louisiana from 1962 to 1973
Eleanor Carothers (1882–1957), American zoologist, geneticist, and cytologist
Isaac Carothers, former alderman of the 29th ward on the far west side of the City of Chicago
Robert Carothers (born 1942), served as the tenth president of the University of Rhode Island from 1991 to 2009
Thomas Carothers, international expert on international democracy support, democratization and U.S. foreign policy
Wallace Carothers (1896–1937), American chemist, inventor, the leader of organic chemistry at DuPont, credited with the invention of nylon

See also
Carothers equation gives the degree of polymerization, Xn, for a given fractional monomer conversion, p
John Henry Carothers House, property in Franklin, Tennessee, listed on the National Register of Historic Places in 1989
Carruthers (disambiguation)
Crothers (disambiguation)
Crowther
Crowthers